The 2020–21 Euro Hockey Tour was the 25th season of Euro Hockey Tour. It started in November 2020 and lasted until May 2021. It consisted of Karjala Tournament, Channel One Cup, Beijer Hockey Games and Carlson Hockey Games.

Standings

Karjala Tournament

The Karjala Cup was played between 5–8 November 2020. All six matches were played in Helsinki, Finland. The tournament was won by Russia.

Channel One Cup 

The 2020 Channel One Cup was played between 17–20 December 2020. All six matches were played in Moscow, Russia. The tournament was won by Russia.

Beijer Hockey Games

The 2021 Beijer Hockey Games were played between 11–14 February 2021. All six matches will be played in Malmö, Sweden. The tournament was won by Russia.

Carlson Hockey Games

The 2021 Carlson Hockey Games were played between 12 May–15 May 2021. The tournament was won by Czech Republic.

External links
 European Hockey Tour on Eurohockey.com

References 

Euro Hockey Tour
2020–21 in European ice hockey